Waterford Township is a township in Camden County, in the U.S. state of New Jersey. As of the 2020 United States census, the township's population was 10,421, a decrease of 228 (−2.1%) from the 2010 census count of 10,649, which in turn reflected an increase of 155 (+1.5%) from the 10,494 counted in the 2000 census.

Waterford Township was originally created by Royal charter on June 1, 1695, while the area was still part of Gloucester County. The township was incorporated by an act of the New Jersey Legislature on February 21, 1798. On March 13, 1844, Waterford Township became one of the original townships in the newly created Camden County. The settlement of Long-a-Coming (now the borough of Berlin) along the White Horse Pike (U.S. Route 30) in Waterford was the new county's first seat, but lost that designation in 1848 when the seat moved to the city of Camden. Portions of the township were taken over the years to form Delaware Township (on February 28, 1844, now Cherry Hill), Chesilhurst (November 26, 1887), Voorhees Township (March 1, 1899) and Berlin Township (March 11, 1910). The township was named for Waterford, Ireland.

Geography
According to the United States Census Bureau, the township had a total area of 36.22 square miles (93.81 km2), including 36.00 square miles (93.25 km2) of land and 0.22 square miles (0.56 km2) of water (0.60%).

Unincorporated communities, localities and place names located partially or completely within the borough include Atco, Atco Lake, Bishops, Dunbarton, Fisher, Jackson, Louden and Pestletown.

The township borders the municipalities of Berlin, Berlin Township, Chesilhurst and Winslow Township in Camden County; Hammonton in Atlantic County; and Evesham Township, Medford Township and Shamong Township in Burlington County.

Demographics

2010 census

The Census Bureau's 2006–2010 American Community Survey showed that (in 2010 inflation-adjusted dollars) median household income was $76,786 (with a margin of error of +/− $9,237) and the median family income was $87,774 (+/− $9,978). Males had a median income of $54,714 (+/− $3,576) versus $42,896 (+/− $4,994) for females. The per capita income for the borough was $31,193 (+/− $2,094). About 2.6% of families and 5.5% of the population were below the poverty line, including 7.0% of those under age 18 and 7.7% of those age 65 or over.

2000 census
As of the 2000 United States census there were 10,494 people, 3,542 households, and 2,791 families residing in the township. The racial makeup of the township was 92.75% White, 4.18% African American, 0.21% Native American, 0.90% Asian, 0.01% Pacific Islander, 0.67% from other races, and 1.29% from two or more races. Hispanic or Latino of any race were 2.07% of the population.

There were 3,542 households, out of which 39.0% had children under the age of 18 living with them, 64.5% were married couples living together, 9.7% had a female householder with no husband present, and 21.2% were non-families. 16.7% of all households were made up of individuals, and 5.3% had someone living alone who was 65 years of age or older. The average household size was 2.90 and the average family size was 3.27.

In the township the population was spread out, with 25.7% under the age of 18, 8.2% from 18 to 24, 32.6% from 25 to 44, 25.4% from 45 to 64, and 8.1% who were 65 years of age or older. The median age was 36 years. For every 100 females, there were 100.3 males.  For every 100 females age 18 and over, there were 99.6 males.

The median income for a household in the township was $59,075, and the median income for a family was $63,693. Males had a median income of $41,561 versus $28,763 for females. The per capita income for the township was $21,676. About 3.6% of families and 5.6% of the population were below the poverty line, including 4.9% of those under age 18 and 7.8% of those age 65 or over.

Government

Local government
Waterford Township is governed under the Township form of New Jersey municipal government, one of 141 municipalities (of the 564) statewide that use this form, the second-most commonly used form of government in the state. The Township Committee is comprised of five members, who are elected directly by the voters at-large in partisan elections to serve three-year terms of office on a staggered basis, with either one or two seats coming up for election each year as part of the November general election in a three-year cycle. The Mayor and Deputy Mayor are chosen by the Township Committee from among its members during a reorganization meeting held each January.

, members of the Waterford Township Committee are Mayor Andrew L. Wade (I, term on committee ends December 31, 2024; term as mayor ends 2022), Thomas Giangiulio Jr. (R, 2023), Eric Romolini (D, 2022), Howard S. Wilson (D, 2022) and Richard T. Yeatman Sr. (D, 2023).

Federal, state, and county representation
Waterford Township is located in the 1st Congressional District and is part of New Jersey's 8th state legislative district. 

Prior to the 2011 reapportionment following the 2010 Census, Waterford Township had been in the 6th state legislative district.

Politics
As of March 2011, there were a total of 7,364 registered voters in Waterford Township, of which 2,438 (33.1%) were registered as Democrats, 1,386 (18.8%) were registered as Republicans and 3,536 (48.0%) were registered as Unaffiliated. There were 4 voters registered as Libertarians or Greens.

In the 2012 presidential election, Democrat Barack Obama received 50.4% of the vote (2,501 cast), ahead of Republican Mitt Romney with 48.5% (2,406 votes), and other candidates with 1.2% (58 votes), among the 5,012 ballots cast by the township's 7,783 registered voters (47 ballots were spoiled), for a turnout of 64.4%. In the 2008 presidential election, Democrat Barack Obama received 50.0% of the vote (2,708 cast), ahead of Republican John McCain, who received around 46.5% (2,517 votes), with 5,411 ballots cast among the township's 7,323 registered voters, for a turnout of 73.9%. In the 2004 presidential election, Republican George W. Bush received 49.3% of the vote (2,582 ballots cast), outpolling Democrat John Kerry, who received around 47.1% (2,468 votes), with 5,242 ballots cast among the township's 7,107 registered voters, for a turnout percentage of 73.8.

In the 2013 gubernatorial election, Republican Chris Christie received 70.7% of the vote (2,253 cast), ahead of Democrat Barbara Buono with 27.9% (889 votes), and other candidates with 1.4% (43 votes), among the 3,271 ballots cast by the township's 7,828 registered voters (86 ballots were spoiled), for a turnout of 41.8%. In the 2009 gubernatorial election, Republican Chris Christie received 54.9% of the vote (1,749 ballots cast), ahead of both Democrat Jon Corzine with 36.7% (1,168 votes) and Independent Chris Daggett with 4.9% (155 votes), with 3,186 ballots cast among the township's 7,462 registered voters, yielding a 42.7% turnout.

Education
The Waterford Township School District serves public school students in pre-kindergarten through sixth grade. As of the 2018–19 school year, the district, comprised of three schools, had an enrollment of 819 students and 78.5 classroom teachers (on an FTE basis), for a student–teacher ratio of 10.4:1. Schools in the district (with 2018–19 enrollment data from the National Center for Education Statistics) are 
Thomas Richards Early Childhood Center with 221 students in grades 2–3 (now Pre-K–K), 
Atco Elementary School with 193 students in grades K–1 (now grades 1–2) and
Waterford Elementary School with 400 students in grades 4–6.

For seventh through twelfth grades, public school students attend the Hammonton Public Schools in Hammonton as part of a sending/receiving relationship, alongside students from Folsom, who attend for grades 9–12 as part of an agreement with the Folsom Borough School District. In the wake of the dissolution of the Lower Camden County Regional School District, the Hammonton board of education voted in 1999 to begin accepting an estimated 800 students from Waterford Township for grades 7–12 starting as soon as 2002, with the tuition paid by students from Waterford helping to lower overall costs to Hammonton taxpayers and the New Jersey Department of Education approved the agreement. Schools in the Hammonton district attended by Waterford Township students (with 2018–19 enrollment data from the National Center for Education Statistics) are 
Hammonton Middle School with 879 students in grades 6–8 and 
Hammonton High School with 1,393 students in grade 9–12.

Assumption School, located in Atco, was an elementary school that operated under the auspices of the Roman Catholic Diocese of Camden, which closed the school at the end of the 2012–2013 school year in the wake of declining enrollment, though parents and contributors  argued that they had raised the funds and met the attendance criteria needed to keep the school operating.

Transportation

Roads and highways

U.S. Route 30 (White Horse Pike) enters from Berlin borough and continues for  into Chesilhurst. while Route 73 runs for a short distance along the township's western border, entering from Winslow Township and exiting into Berlin borough. U.S. 30 and NJ 73 intersect on the west side of the township.

The closest limited access road is the Atlantic City Expressway in neighboring Winslow Township. Interstate 295 and the New Jersey Turnpike are two towns away.

Public transportation

The Atco station provides NJ Transit train service to the 30th Street Station in Philadelphia and the Atlantic City Rail Terminal in Atlantic City on the Atlantic City Line.

NJ Transit local bus service is available on the 554 route from Lindenwold to Atlantic City and on the 459 route.

Notable people

People who were born in, residents of, or otherwise closely associated with Waterford Township include:

 Kellyanne Conway (born 1967), strategist and pollster who was campaign manager for Republican presidential candidate Donald Trump in 2016
 Rey Ramsey, social justice entrepreneur
 Jimmy Snuka (1943–2017), semi-retired professional wrestler and actor
 Sally Starr (1923–2013), 1950s celebrity television personality
 John Wesley Wescott (1849–1927), lawyer and jurist who served as New Jersey Attorney General from 1914 to 1919

References

External links

Waterford Township municipal website
Waterford Township School District website

School Data for the Waterford Township School District, National Center for Education Statistics
School closing information
Hammonton Public Schools

 
1695 establishments in New Jersey
Populated places established in 1695
Township form of New Jersey government
Townships in Camden County, New Jersey